Kabyle people, an ethnic group in Algeria
 Kabyle language
 Kabyle alphabet, also known as Berber Latin alphabet
 Kabyle grammar
 Kabylie, the Kabyle ethnic homeland
 Kabyles du Pacifique, a group of Algerians deported to New Caledonia after an uprising in 1871
 Kabyle (ancient city), an ancient Thracian city in southeastern Bulgaria
 Kabile, Bulgaria, a modern village near the Thracian city
 Kabyle musket

See also
 JS Kabylie, Algerian football team

Language and nationality disambiguation pages